Anthrenini is a tribe of beetles in the family Dermestidae. There are at least 100 described species in Anthrenini.

Genera
 Anthrenus Geoffroy, 1762 (carpet beetles)
 Caccoleptus Sharp, 1902
 Cryptorhopalum Guérin-Méneville, 1838
 Ctesias Stephens, 1830
 Dearthrus LeConte, 1861
 Labrocerus Sharp, 1885
 Megatoma Herbst, 1792
 Neoanthrenus Armstrong, 1941
 Orphinus Motschulsky, 1858
 Phradonoma Jacquilin du Val, 1859
 Pseudohadrotoma Kalik, 1949
 Reesa Beal, 1967
 Thaumaglossa Redtenbacher, 1867
 Trogoderma Dejean, 1821

References

 Beal, R. S. Jr. (2003). "Annotated Checklist of Nearctic Dermestidae with Revised Key to the Genera". The Coleopterists Bulletin, vol. 57, no. 4, 391–404.

Further reading

 Arnett, R.H. Jr., M. C. Thomas, P. E. Skelley and J. H. Frank. (eds.). (2002). American Beetles, Volume II: Polyphaga: Scarabaeoidea through Curculionoidea. CRC Press LLC, Boca Raton, FL.
 Arnett, Ross H. (2000). American Insects: A Handbook of the Insects of America North of Mexico. CRC Press.
 Richard E. White. (1983). Peterson Field Guides: Beetles. Houghton Mifflin Company.

Dermestidae